Quilmes is a city on the coast of the Rio de la Plata, in the , on the south east of the Greater Buenos Aires. The city was founded in 1666 and it is the seat of the eponymous county.

History
The Quilmes were a native tribe who lived in the surroundings of Tucumán. In the 17th century, after repeated attempts by the Spanish invaders to control their lands, the Quilmes were defeated and were forced to settle in a restricted colony (reducción) near Buenos Aires, where the authorities could control them. The settlement was thus established in 1666 as Exaltación de la Santa Cruz de los Kilme. The  journey from Tucumán was made on foot, causing hundreds of Quilmes to die in the process. The colony had been abandoned  by 1810 and had become a ghost town. The land was divided in parcels and the town of Quilmes was established in 1818. During the first British invasion, lasting 46 days in 1806, the British arrived from Montevideo through Quilmes and went to Buenos Aires from there.

Quilmes was also inhabited by British immigrants. Juan Clark, born in Yorkshire, England, was president of the municipality in 1855. The Clark' were owners of land in Quilmes, and were linked to the Irish and Scottish community, established in the area since 1830s.

In 1898 was established in the area the St. George's College, a private educational institution run by the Reverend Joseph Thomas Stevenson.

The town's development accelerated during the wave of immigration in Argentina during the late 19th century, and Quilmes was considered as the location for a new provincial capital during the Federalization of Buenos Aires of 1880 (ultimately established in La Plata). The Argentine Air Force established a 220 ha (540 acre) base in East Quilmes in 1943. In 1944, Impa (Industria Metallurgica y Plastica Argentina) opened Argentina's first airplane plant at Quilmes. Impa had been blacklisted by the United States government due to its connections to Nazi-occupied Austria and fascist figures within Argentina itself.  The airplanes were considered of "antiquated design" according to the New York Times.

Quilmes proper consists of two main parts, east and west, which are divided by the tracks of the Metropolitano passenger train line. East Quilmes has several relatively wealthy areas and a large shopping district. As one travels east toward the Río de la Plata, neighborhoods become increasingly poor, and two large villas miseria (slums) are found close to the river. These areas often experience severe flooding.

Quilmes is the home of two football teams: Quilmes Atlético Club and Club Atlético Argentino de Quilmes. The first was founded in the 19th century by Cannon J. T. Stevenson, and the second one was founded later, by Argentines who were not allowed to play for the QAC. They are two of the oldest Argentine football teams. The city has been chosen by FIH to host the 2014 Men's Hockey Champions Trophy.

The city also gives its name to the Cerveza Quilmes beer company, as this is where it was first brewed in 1888 where the brewery was started by Otto Bemberg; the establishment remains a leading employer in the city. Other significant manufacturers in Quilmes include textile maker La Bernalesa, glass maker Cattorini, construction materials maker Cerámica Quilmes, and climate control equipment maker Rheem.

Famous Quilmeños include television variety show host Susana Giménez, football forward Sergio Agüero, painter Carlos Morel, sculptor Victor de Pol, boxer Sergio Martínez, and the rock band Vox Dei. Aníbal Fernández, who was born in Quilmes, served as mayor from 1991 to 1995, and from 2003 as Minister of Interior, of Justice, as Chief of the Cabinet of Ministers, and Senator.

Notable people
 

Rubén Oscar Cocimano (born 1962), former Argentine football player
William Henry Hudson, author of "Far Away and Long Ago, A Childhood in Argentina"

See also

 List of twin towns and sister cities in Argentina

References

External links

 - New York Times article from 1944 about new airplane factory at Quilmes
Municipality of Quilmes - Official Quilmes website 
UKULA Travel Section - Quilmes Travelogue
 

 
Populated places in Buenos Aires Province
Populated places established in 1818
Cities in Argentina
1666 establishments in the Spanish Empire
Argentina